Dan Malesela is a South African soccer coach, who is currently the head coach of Marumo Gallants.

Career

In 2012, Malesela was appointed manager of South African second division side United FC.

In 2015, he was appointed manager of Chippa United in the South African top flight.

In 2018, he was appointed manager of South African second division club TS Galaxy, helping them win the 2018-19 Nedbank Cup with a 1-0 win over Kaizer Chiefs, one of the most successful teams in South Africa.

In 2020, Malesela returned to South African top flight outfit Chippa United.

References

External links
 

South African soccer managers
Living people
Chippa United F.C. managers
Orlando Pirates F.C. players
South African soccer players
Association footballers not categorized by position
1965 births